Statistics of Second Division Football Tournament in the 2010 season.

Stadiums
Group stage were played at Maafannu Turd Ground. League round was held at Gaumee Football Dhan'du.

Teams
9 teams are competition in the 2010 Second Division Football Tournament. These teams were divided into 2 groups (5 teams in group A, 4 in group B).

Group A
Club Eagles
Club Gaamagu
Police Club
Sports Club Mecano
United Victory

Group B
Dhivehi Sifainge Club
Hurriyya Sports Club
L.T. Sports Club
Red Line Club

Group stage
From each group, the top three teams will be advanced for the league round.

Police Club, Club Eagles and United Victory advanced to the league round from Group A. L.T. Sports Club, Dhivehi Sifainge Club and Red Line Club advanced from Group B.

League round
The top three teams from each group is qualified to this round. This round will be played between the 6 teams, where they will be engaged in a round-robin tournament within itself. The highest ranked team will be declared as champions. Second placed team will be qualified to play in the 2011 Dhivehi league play-off with the champion team.

Dhivehi Sifainge Club won topped the league round, while Club Eagles finished at second.  Due to the Football Association of Maldives rules, Dhivehi Sifainge Club is not eligible to play in any play-offs for the first division. Therefore, the play-offs were held with only 3 teams.

Awards

Notes

  Club Eagles gained promotion to the 2011 Dhivehi League after winning second in the 2011 Dhivehi league play-off.

References

Maldivian Second Division Football Tournament seasons
Maldives
Maldives
2